Richard Joyce (c. 1660 – c. 1737) was an Irish goldsmith. Joyce was a member of one of the Tribes of Galway and is credited with the creation of the Claddagh Ring.

In 1675 he left Galway to serve as an indentured servant in the West Indies but his ship was intercepted by pirates from Algeria who enslaved the entire crew. Joyce became the slave of a man in Algiers, said to be a goldsmith, who made him his apprentice.

In 1689 William III became King of England and enforced a request upon the Algerians to release all of his subjects enslaved in the country. Joyce's master offered him half the business and his daughter's hand in marriage if he stayed, but he refused and returned to Galway. There, he is said to have created the original Claddagh ring. Examples of his work from the time of his release to 1737 are still extant. He settled near Rahoon, then outside the town, married and had issue.

Joyce's role in the creation of the ring is somewhat debatable, in that goldsmiths such as Richard Joyce (fl. 1648) and Dominick Martin (died 1676) were already operating in Galway. However, his designs seem to have been the most popular at the time, and perhaps the basis of the present design, so he can be credited as its creator.

References

 The mis-titled ‘Joyce’ tomb in the Collegiate Church of St Nicholas, Galway, James Mitchell, vol. 40, 1985–1986
 Galway Goldsmiths:Their mark and ware, Jack Mulveen, Journal of the Galway Archaeological and Historical Society, vol. 46, 1994
 "Claddagh Ring" in The Concise Oxford Dictionary, ed. Judy Pearsall, Oxford University Press, 2004

People from County Galway
Arabian slaves and freedmen
Irish goldsmiths
1660s births
1737 deaths
17th-century Irish people
18th-century Irish people
17th-century slaves
18th-century slaves
Slavery in Algeria
African slaves
Slaves from the Ottoman Empire